Tereza Neumanová (born 9 August 1998) is a Czech professional racing cyclist, who currently rides for UCI Women's Continental Team . She rode in the women's road race at the 2019 UCI Road World Championships in Yorkshire, England.

Major results
2017
 2nd Road race, National Road Championships
 6th Horizon Park Women Challenge
2019
 1st  Road race, National Road Chanpionships
2020
 2nd Road race, National Road Championships
2021
 1st  Road race, National Road Chanpionships

References

External links
 

1998 births
Living people
Czech female cyclists
Place of birth missing (living people)
Olympic cyclists of the Czech Republic
Cyclists at the 2020 Summer Olympics